Marcin Gawron and Andriej Kapaś are the defending champions, but lost in the first round this year.
Andre Begemann and Martin Emmrich won the title, defeating Tomasz Bednarek and Mateusz Kowalczyk 3–6, 6–1, [10–3] in the final.

Seeds

Draw

Draw

References
 Main Draw

Pekao Szczecin Open - Doubles
2012 Doubles
2012 in Polish tennis